Samavak (also Romanized as Samāvak) is a village in Shahsavan Kandi Rural District, in the Central District of Saveh County, Markazi Province, Iran. At the 2006 census, its population was 9, in 5 families.

References 

Populated places in Saveh County